Yurisangja is a South Korean male duo formed in 1997. They are best known for their pop-ballads.

Name
"Yurisangja" (유리상자) means "glass box." The reason they chose it was derived from their hope – the one of putting in it the most precious things of the world. Because a glass box is transparent, as far as something valuable is put in that box, it can be seen, undistorted, from the outside. They wanted to show people the most precious and beautiful things of the world as they are.

History 
Park Seung-hwa made his debut as a solo singer in 1993. While Park was singing the 2nd album songs, Lee Se-jun, also a solo singer back then that was popular among girls with albums with cartoonish concepts, participated in the chorus for Park’s performance. So, they made a team – Yurisangja.The duo first had a debut concert through an online independent internet broadcasting station m2tv. This duo released its first album  in 1997, 'The True Love Story.’ It received rave reviews, and won and maintained popularity for a long period. The 2nd album, ‘Looking for Love,’ was released in 1998. Its title song was ‘331,’ which was much loved and proved Yurisangja’s popularity, though it had religious tints. The 3rd album, Be Happy, released in 1999 ranked high in almost all charts, and became a frequently used wedding song. It gave the best songwriter award to Lee, who wrote its lyrics. In the 4th album, ‘Home,’ they changed their style by making album themselves. Afterwards, they, having tried a ‘dynamic’ change, went back again to a ‘static’ stage on which they released their 5th album, ‘Sinabro (Little by Little)’ in 2001.‘Can We Love?,’ the title of the 5th album, hit the jackpot so that it makes them the king of ballad. Yurisangja, with their enduring popularity, have been continuously loved of fans through the 6th album title ‘A Good Day’ and the 7th album title ‘Still.’

Members 
Park Seung-hwa (Hangul: 박승화; born 11 March 1969) 
Lee Se-jun (Hangul: 이세준; born 6 July 1972)

Discography

Studio albums

Awards 
 KBS Music Award (1999) – Best Songwriter
 The 13th Seoul Music Award (2002) – Best Folk Song Singer

References

External links 
 Official website

K-pop music groups
South Korean folk rock groups
Musical groups established in 1997
South Korean boy bands
South Korean musical duos